Risk of Rain 2 is a roguelike third-person shooter developed by Hopoo Games and published by Gearbox Publishing. A sequel to 2013's Risk of Rain, it was released in early access for Microsoft Windows, Nintendo Switch, PlayStation 4 and Xbox One in 2019 before fully releasing in August 2020 with a release for Stadia coming a month later.

Players control a survivor who is stranded on an alien planet. To survive, they navigate through various environments, killing monsters and looting chests to collect items that boost their offensive and defensive capabilities. Over time, the game's difficulty increases, spawning more powerful and dangerous creatures. The game supports up to four players in online multiplayer. The game received generally positive reviews upon release.

Gameplay

Risk of Rain 2 follows a similar approach to the first title, in which one to four players must progress several levels while killing enemies. Most survivors are locked until the player completes challenges pertaining to each one; the only survivors available at first are the Commando and Huntress. There are a total of fourteen survivors, two of which are only available in the Survivors of the Void expansion. Each survivor has their own unique set of skills, providing different approaches to gameplay based on which survivor the player chooses. Risk of Rain 2 features several of the same playable characters, creatures, and items from the first game, but also adds new survivors and most notably transitions the game from 2D to a 3D environment.

On each level, the goal is to kill aliens while locating a teleporter randomly placed on the level; once the teleporter is activated, the players must defend themselves from a larger onslaught of aliens, including bosses, until the teleporter is fully charged. Each alien killed drops experience and currency which the player picks up. Experience is added to the player's level, and if enough is gained, the player will level up, slightly increasing their damage dealt and max health. Currency can be used to open chests found throughout the level that drop random items, or to activate turrets and drones which can either attack enemies or heal the player. Currency cannot be carried between levels, as all currency is converted to experience before teleporting to the next level. The items collected from chests offer a wide range of boosts to the players carrying them and provide both synergistic effects with other items as well as the potential to stack their effects if multiple copies of the same item are acquired.

The difficulty of the game increases as the player progresses through a run, based on the duration of the current run as well as an initial difficulty scale set by the player. Every few minutes, the aliens' level increases, thus scaling their max health and damage the longer the player's run progresses. In the metagame, players unlock access to new playable survivors, items, abilities and game modifiers by completing certain in-game achievements; once unlocked, new survivors and modifiers become available to select from at the start of the game, and new items will start appearing randomly from in-game chests.

Development
When they started development on the sequel, Hopoo started with a 2D-based prototype with the player in control of one of the monsters in the first game, as to mix up the formula for the sequel. The transition to 3D was partly inspired by fan art for the original game  that showed the various objects the player collected shown on the character. Hopoo wanted to use this approach for the sequel, but the 2D graphic approach did not give them enough visual space to work with. They transitioned the prototype from 2D to 2.5D, representing the character in 3D graphics but otherwise playing as a 2D platformer, however this did not work to their satisfaction and felt it was better to move the game fully to 3D, with the transition being relatively quick to complete. Hopoo Games noted that the 3D option provided "much deeper design spaces and more possibilities for cool gameplay" as well as more ways to artistically express themselves. The sequel was first announced in May 2017, at which time the team had already been working on the game for 6 months. The sequel uses the Unity engine, which Hopoo had to learn to use, and 3D levels which the team spent a long time making. In designing some of the returning monsters Hopoo noted that they had to design new attacks to make them more challenging in a 3D space. Items also had to be redesigned to deal with the dimension change.

Hopoo released the game into early access on Windows on March 27, 2019, at the time they estimated that the full development process they would take another year.  During the early access period, Hopoo signed with Gearbox Publishing to release the game on Nintendo Switch, PlayStation 4, and Xbox One. It was also released in early access for those platforms on August 30, 2019. Its full release was initially scheduled for Q2 2020 but was delayed in order to expand the scope of its 1.0 update. A free content update titled the "Anniversary Update" was released on March 25, 2021. A paid expansion for the game called "Survivors of the Void" was released on March 1, 2022 for Windows, and the console versions of the expansion are currently set for release in 2023.

In November 2022, Gearbox Entertainment acquired the Risk of Rain IP. Hopoo Games remains an independent studio. Hopoo now states that they are working on other games and projects.

Release
The game was released out of early access for Microsoft Windows on August 11, 2020. It was released for Stadia on September 29, 2020 with a timed exclusive level. The Nintendo Switch, PlayStation 4, and Xbox One received the 1.0 update on October 20, 2020.

Reception

On its launch into early access, Hopoo Games offered Risk of Rain 2 with a "buy one, get one free" promotion for the first few days. A week from release, Hopoo announced that over 650,000 players had played the game, with about 150,000 of those having taken advantage of the special promotion. Within a month of the game's early access release, it had sold over a million copies. By March 2021, the game had sold over four million units on the personal computer side alone, not accounting for console sales.

Awards 
Risk of Rain 2 was nominated for awards following its release. At the 2021 SXSW Gaming Awards, the game was nominated for Indie Game of the Year and for Excellence in Multiplayer.  At the Indie Live Expo II, the game was nominated for Best "Game Feel" Award.

References

2020 video games
Early access video games
Gearbox Software games
Indie video games
Multiplayer and single-player video games
Nintendo Switch games
PlayStation 4 games
Roguelike video games
Science fiction video games
Third-person shooters
Video games developed in the United States
Video games set on fictional planets
Windows games
Xbox One games
Video game sequels